Mother of pearl is a common name for nacre, a composite material formed by molluscs. Mother of pearl, also spelt mother-of-pearl, may also refer to:

Biology
 Catasetum pileatum, commonly known as mother of pearl flower
 Patania ruralis, commonly known as mother of pearl moth
 Two genera of butterflies:
 Protogoniomorpha, commonly known as mother-of-pearls
 Salamis (butterfly), commonly known as mother-of-pearls

Songs
 "Mother of Pearl", a song by Roxy Music from the album Stranded
 "Mother of Pearl", a song by Nellie McKay from the album Obligatory Villagers

Other uses
 Mother of Pearl (novel), a 1999 novel by Melinda Haynes
 Mother-of-pearl cloud, another name for a polar stratospheric cloud

See also
 Mother-of-pearl carving in Bethlehem, a traditional handicraft